The  was an electric multiple unit (EMU) train type operated by the Tokyo subway operator Tokyo Metro on the Tokyo Metro Ginza Line subway in Tokyo, Japan, from 1983 until March 2017. A total of 38 six-car trainsets (228 cars) were built between 1983 and 1997 in five batches, and the design received the 25th Laurel Prize of the Japan Railfan Club in 1985.

The trains used a Train Automatic Stopping Controller (TASC) system allowing them to automatically stop at stations.

History
By the early 1980s, most of the rolling stock on the Ginza Line were showing signs of aging; some of the stock dated back to before the Second World War, giving a dated image of the line to its passengers. The 01 series was introduced in 1984 with the design theme being "functionality, brightness and chicness". The prototype was completed in May 1983, delivered in September and commenced service on 31 December 1983. It was followed by the introduction of production units starting in 1984. Set number 38 entered service in 1997, being the last train to do so. The 01 series was awarded the Laurel Prize from the Japan Railfan Club in 1985.

The first 23 sets were not originally fitted with any air-conditioning system due to structure gauge restrictions caused by the small tunnel size of the line. In 1990, Mitsubishi Electric developed a 240mm thick compact air-conditioning unit with a capacity of 16.2 kW. A prototype air-conditioning unit was tested on set 16 in August and subsequent non-air conditioned sets were all retrofitted afterwards. The ceilings of the air-conditioned trains were lower than that of non-air conditioned trains to accommodate the unit. The trains which were built with air conditioning always had low ceilings.

In November 1986, a practical test of a high-frequency shunt chopper control device that used a power transistor for the element of the field chopper device was conducted on this series for the Tokyo Metro 02 series. In 2007, car 01-238 of set 38 was experimentally fitted with permanent-magnet synchronous motors. In January 2011, the four intermediate cars of set 38 were experimentally fitted with LED lighting. and in December 2011, set 37 was retrofitted with silicon carbide variable frequency drives for trial purposes.

Formations
The six-car sets were formed as shown below, with three motored (M) cars and three non-powered trailer (T) cars, and car 1 at the Shibuya end.

 Note:
 CHP: Chopper control
 MG: 15 kVA motor-generator
 SIV1: 110 kVA static inverter (for cooling)
 SIV2: 40 kVA static inverter
 CP: Air compressor
 BT: Battery

Batches

Undercarriage equipment

Interior

Withdrawal

The 01 series trains began to be replaced by new 1000 series trains from spring 2012. The first set to be withdrawn, set 38, was removed for scrapping in August 2013. By 1 April 2016, nine sets remained in service. The last remaining 01 series train was withdrawn from regular service on 10 March 2017, with a special commemorative final run for invited guests on 12 March.

Resale

Two more cars, 01-135 and 01-635, were sold to the Kumamoto Electric Railway during fiscal 2015.

Preserved examples

Three cars of former set 1 (01-101, 01-201, and 01-601), withdrawn from revenue service in 2013, are kept for training purposes at Nakano Depot in Tokyo.

The cab end of car 01-129 is preserved inside the Metro Museum in Edogawa, Tokyo.

Car 01-630 was donated to the University of Tokyo's Institute of Industrial Science Chiba Experiment Station in Chiba Prefecture in 2017 for use on its 333 m long research test track.

References

External links

 Tokyo Metro Ginza Line 01 series information 
 Tokyo Metro Vietnam 

Electric multiple units of Japan
01 series
Train-related introductions in 1983
600 V DC multiple units
Kawasaki multiple units
Nippon Sharyo multiple units
Kinki Sharyo multiple units
Tokyu Car multiple units